David Colin Arthur Shotter  (3 January 193922 May 2021) was a British archaeologist and Professor of Roman Imperial History at the University of Lancaster.

Career 
Shotter was born in London and educated at King's College School, London and the University of Southampton. He taught at Magee University College, Derry (now part of Ulster University) from 1964 to 1966 and was appointed Lecturer in the Department of Classics at the University of Lancaster in 1966.

During his career, he established and chaired over 40 annual archaeological conferences for the university's Centre for North-West Regional Studies. He was Principal of Lonsdale College, Lancaster and was appointed Professor of Roman Imperial History in 2003 and retired in 2004.

Shotter worked to establish the Cumbria and Lancashire Archaeological Unit (1979), which later became the LU Archaeological Unit (1986). He was a Fellow of the Society of Antiquaries.

He was also a co-founder of the Lancaster Archaeological and Historical Society and its journal, Contrebis. He also played a major role in the Cumberland and Westmorland Antiquarian and Archaeological Society, as a council member, vice-president and president (2005-2008).

Bibliography

References 

1939 births
2021 deaths
People from London
People educated at King's College School, London
Alumni of the University of Southampton
Academics of Lancaster University
Fellows of the Society of Antiquaries of London
Cumberland and Westmorland Antiquarian and Archaeological Society
English classical scholars
Historians of ancient Rome